Akaike Station (赤池駅) is the name of the following train stations in Japan:

 Akaike Station (Aichi)
 Akaike Station (Fukuoka)
 Akaike Station (Gifu)